This is a list of the works that American filmmaker and producer Francis Lawrence has been involved with.

Film 

Assistant director
 Pump Up the Volume (1990)
 Marching Out of Time (1993)

Television

Music videos

References

 Videography
American filmographies
Director videographies
Director filmographies